SaferSurf is a software product for anonymous internet surfing. Aside from offering web anonymity, it has several other features, such as a geolocation proxy service bypassing country restrictions. SaferSurf runs centrally on a server and doesn't need a local installation. 

SaferSurf was created and developed by a team from Nutzwerk, a German software company headquartered in Leipzig developing internet technologies. 

It obtained the TÜV certification in 2005, 2006, 2007, 2008 and 2009. It was tested for a wide range of viruses and false alarms.

Features

SaferSurf provides various features:

 Malware checking: Potentially dangerous online enquiries are rooted via the SaferSurf proxy server that examines all data for malware before they reach the computer. If dangerous or undesirable data are detected, they are removed from the data stream on the internet.
 Protection of anonymity: SaferSurf calls up the websites on the user's behalf, making it impossible to store the user's IP address. Also, whenever the user goes from one website to another, SaferSurf deletes the referrer information from the data stream. Finally, it provides a list of known "eavesdroppers".
 Spam and phishing e-mail protection
 Faster internet access: High-speed servers with 1 Gbit connections.
 Access to blocked websites: the Unblock Stick lets the user bypass firewalls and other net restrictions without needing administrative rights on the machine. When private mode is set, the internet browser will not store traces of the user's activity.
 Setting the maximum lifespan of cookies
 Unblocking videos on YouTube and other media portals: SaferSurf's different proxy locations bypass country restrictions, while the websites maintain their full functionality because of special SSL-Proxy-Server that loads the website directly using an encrypted connection. The geolocation function allows the user to adopt the IP of a specific country.
 Not storing the user's IP address: That way, even SaferSurf can't link the user with the browsed content.

Reception

When SaferSurf was released in 2003, the media praised its speed. Hamburger Abendblatt wrote: "Surf up to ten times faster, virus-free: that is the service offered by the company Nutzwerk. (...) Even with a slow modem connection, the data reaches its goal faster (...)" Pocket PC magazine wrote: "Indeed, with the assistance of SaferSurf Speed web pages display up to three times faster (...) SaferSurf Speed works independently from any ISP and internet connection (standard modem, ISDN, DSL, mobile communications, LAN, etc.) you use."

Other media gave more weight to anonymity and protection. The Bild's computer magazine tested several web anonymity programs and cited "reliable anonymization" among the advantages of SaferSurf. In the same year, Macworld praised its spam-filtering service.

References

External links

Computer security software
Software